Michael Chris (born October 8, 1957 in Santa Monica, California) is a former Major League Baseball pitcher who attended the West Los Angeles Junior College. 

 Chris appeared in games in three Major League seasons, starting approximately half of the games.  The Detroit Tigers drafted him with the 10th overall pick of the 1977 Major League Baseball Draft and promoted him to the majors in 1979 to pitch in 13 games, starting eight.  Chris finished with a record of three wins against three losses, with a 6.92 ERA.  The Tigers traded him to the San Francisco Giants in 1981 with Dan Schatzeder for Larry Herndon.  He pitched in part of two seasons for the Giants, but they placed him on waivers in 1983.  The Chicago Cubs claimed him, but he never pitched for the Cubs, and they released him in the offseason.

References

External links
  
Baseball Almanac
Retrosheet
Venezuelan Professional Baseball League

1957 births
Living people
Baseball players from Santa Monica, California
Birmingham Barons players
Detroit Tigers players
Evansville Triplets players
LAPC Brahma Bulls baseball players
Lakeland Tigers players
Leones del Caracas players
American expatriate baseball players in Venezuela
Major League Baseball pitchers
Montgomery Rebels players
Phoenix Giants players
San Francisco Giants players
Tacoma Tigers players
West Los Angeles College alumni
West Los Angeles Wildcats baseball players
Venice High School (Los Angeles) alumni